Jonathan Twingley is an American artist, illustrator and author. His work is regularly exhibited in galleries and museums throughout the United States. His paintings and illustrations also appear in The New York Times, The Washington Post, The Los Angeles Times, The Wall Street Journal, The Atlantic Monthly, The New Republic, Mother Jones, and The Progressive.

Twingley's first novel The Badlands Saloon was published by Scribner in 2009.

Early life
Twingley was born in Bismarck, North Dakota. His mother was a librarian. His father was an artist and high school arts instructor. Twingley's primary and high school education occurred in his home town of Bismarck. He earned his Bachelor of Fine Arts degree from Minnesota State University Moorhead in 1996, and completed his Master of Fine Arts (MFA) in illustration at the School of Visual Arts (SVA) in New York City.

Illustrator
As an illustrator, Twingley's work appears regularly in United States national publications including the New York Times, Atlantic Monthly, Los Angeles Times, The Nation, and The New Republic. In addition, Twingley is often commissioned by the Columbia Journalism Review, Boston Magazine, and trade magazine publishers such as Corporate Counsel, The Deal, The Chronicle of Higher Education, and Re-Thinking Schools.

According to a contributing writer for High Plains Reader, Twingley's illustrations show a profound awareness of character − pertaining to people and places alike, he arranges his compositions in a careful manner, like a cinematographer, paying close attention to narrative elements that individualize each separate work.

The Badlands Saloon
After working for over 10 years creating illustrations featured in books, magazines, trade journals and newspapers, Twingley wrote and illustrated The Badlands Saloon, his debut novel. Published by Scribner in 2009, the 224-page hardcover includes 38 full-color illustrations covering 76 pages. It tells the story of Oliver Clay, and his life-changing summer in a small North Dakota town.

Booklist signalled Twingley as "an up-and-coming artist" and praised his "uniquely stylized characters...a gallery of portraits rendered in prose, punctuated by visuals, and delivered with unsentimental but heartfelt honesty."

Recent work
Twingley's paintings and drawings are regularly exhibited in galleries and museums throughout the United States. The first solo museum exhibition of Twingley's art occurred at the University of Minnesota's Rourke Art Gallery. He continues to exhibit his work there, and in the Rourke Art Museum, on a regular basis.

PRINT magazine featured Twingley's work in a showcase of 20 artists under the age of 30. His work has also been recognized by the Society of Illustrators, American Illustration, the Society of Publication Designers, and Communication Arts Magazine.

Arts education
Twingley holds a teaching position as senior lecturer at the University of the Arts (Philadelphia).

He also served as visiting artist-in-residence at Minnesota State University Moorhead, where he met individually with students, lectured on art and writing, and illustrated these with selections from his own work.

In 2012, Twingley juried the Rourke Art Museum's 53rd annual Midwestern exhibit.

See also

References

External links
 
 University of the Arts staff directory
 Simon & Schuster Official Publisher Page

American illustrators
21st-century American novelists
American male novelists
Living people
21st-century American male writers
Year of birth missing (living people)